David Laskin (born October 25, 1953) is an American writer of books about history, travel, weather, gardens and literary biography.

Biography
Born and raised in Great Neck, New York, Laskin graduated from John L. Miller North Senior High and went to Harvard College (BA in history and literature in 1975) and New College, Oxford (MA in English, 1977).  He worked in the editorial department of Bantam Books before becoming a free-lance writer.  Laskin married law professor Kate O’Neill in 1982; in 1993 they moved from New York to Seattle, Washington, with their three daughters, Emily, Sarah and Alice.

Works
Though Laskin has written on a range of subjects, his recent books have focused on ordinary people swept up in the cataclysms of history. Laskin publishes travel articles and book reviews in The New York Times travel section, The Washington Post, and Seattle Metropolitan.

The Family: Three Journeys into the Heart of the 20th Century 
Published by Viking in 2013, The Family tells the story of the three branches of Laskin's mother's family.  At the turn of the last century, the offspring of a pious scribe from the yeshiva town of Volozhin divided into three branches:  one branch came to New York and founded two successful businesses (including the successful Maidenform Bra Company, started by Laskin's great aunt Ida Rosenthal), one branch immigrated to what was then Palestine and helped found the cooperative farm of Kfar Vitkin, and all of those who remained behind perished in the Holocaust.

The Long Way Home
The Long Way Home: An American Journey from Ellis Island to the Great War (2010), unfolds the lives of a dozen European immigrants who served with the American Expeditionary Force when the nation went to war in 1917.  These men– four Italian-Americans, three Jews, two Poles, an Irishman, a Slovak and a Norwegian– fought bravely in the trenches of France and Belgium; three of them were killed in action; two received the Medal of Honor.   The Long Way Home won the 2011 Washington State Book Award for History/General Nonfiction.

The Children’s Blizzard
The Children’s Blizzard, published by HarperCollins in 2004, tells the story of The Schoolhouse Blizzard, a sudden winter storm that bore down on the Upper Midwest on January 12, 1888 and killed hundreds of settlers, many of them children on their way home from one-room prairie schoolhouses.  The book won the 2006 Midwest Booksellers’ Choice Award for Nonfiction, the Pacific Northwest Booksellers Award, the Washington State Book Award, and it was a Quill Award finalist in history.

Bibliography
The Parents Book for New Fathers, Ballantine Books, 1988
Eastern Islands:  Accessible Island of the East Coast, Facts on File, 1990
A Common Life:  Four Generations of American Literary Friendship and Influence, Simon & Schuster, 1994
The Reading Group Book, Plume/Penguin, 1995
Braving the Elements:  The Stormy History of American Weather, Doubleday, 1996
Rains All the Time:  A Connoisseur’s History of Weather in the Pacific Northwest, Sasquatch Books, 1997
Partisans:  Marriage, Politics and Betrayal Among the New York Intellectuals, Simon & Schuster, 2001
Artists in Their Gardens, Sasquatch Books, 2001
The Children’s Blizzard, HarperCollins, 2004
The Long Way Home:  An American Journey from Ellis Island to the Great War, (Harper, 2010)
 The Family: Three Journeys into the Heart of the Twentieth Centurey, (Viking, 2013)

References

External links
 
David Laskin, author page at HarperCollins
 

1953 births
American male writers
Living people
Harvard College alumni
Alumni of New College, Oxford
People from Great Neck, New York
Great Neck North High School alumni